The Wannadies is the début album by the Swedish alternative rock band The Wannadies. It was released in 1990 and reached number twenty-six on the Swedish Albums Chart. The Wannadies includes the singles "My Home Town", "Heaven" and a new recording of the lead song from their début release Smile EP; "The Beast Cures the Lover".

Receiving positive reviews the album was originally released as an LP and CD in August 1990. The album was re-released in 1993 on Snap Records with a pair of covers original performed by T. Rex and The Go-Betweens respectively as bonus tracks. The artwork was designed by Hank with photography by Patrick Degerman.

Track listing

Personnel
The Wannadies are
 Pär Wiksten
 Stefan Schönfeldt
 Fredrik Schönfeldt
 Gunnar Karlsson
 Christina Bergmark
 Björn Segnestam-Malmqvist

Additional musicians, technical and visual
 Ingemar Karlsson - Additional Guitar
 Curt-Åke, Nils - Percussion
 Ingemar Karlsson - Producer
 Johan Nilsson, The Wannadies - Producer ("Lee Remick")
 Curt-Åke Stefan, Nils Löfstedt - Recording
 Anders Lind, Michael Ilbert - Mixing
 Hank - Sleeve
 Patrick Degerman - Photography

References

The Wannadies albums
1990 debut albums